Sheridon Baptiste (born 6 January 1964) is a Canadian former bobsledder, sprinter and Canadian football player. He competed at the 1992 Winter Olympics and the 1994 Winter Olympics in bobsleigh. As a sprinter, he won a gold medal in the 4 x 100 metres relay at the 1994 Jeux de la Francophonie for Canada. After playing Canadian football for Queen's University, Baptiste was selected by the Ottawa Rough Riders in the 4th round of the 1988 CFL Draft but never played professionally.

References

External links
 

1964 births
Living people
Canadian male sprinters
Canadian male bobsledders
Olympic bobsledders of Canada
Bobsledders at the 1992 Winter Olympics
Bobsledders at the 1994 Winter Olympics
Sportspeople from Georgetown, Guyana
Guyanese emigrants to Canada
Black Canadian players of Canadian football
Queen's Golden Gaels football players
Canadian football wide receivers